Dowtu may refer to:
 Dowtu, Isfahan